Rui Orlando Ribeiro Santos Neto (born 24 October 1979), known as Orlando, is a Portuguese former footballer who played as a central defender.

He appeared in at least 100 matches in each of the three major levels of Portuguese football in a 19-year professional career, including 124 in the Primeira Liga (where he represented Moreirense and Académica and scored five goals).

Club career
Born in Santo Tirso, Porto District, Orlando started his career with AD Fafe in the third division in 1998, moving on to Moreirense FC after three years. Under the guidance of Manuel Machado, he was an important defensive member of a side that promoted to the Primeira Liga – the season prior to the player's arrival, the club was also in the third tier.

In 2006, Orlando returned to division three with S.C. Freamunde. After a good season, he was signed by Académica de Coimbra, being an undisputed starter from his debut onwards. In 2008–09 he scored in both matches against F.C. Paços de Ferreira (2–1 win at home, 1–1 away), and continued to be first-choice in the following top-flight campaigns, also being named captain.

Orlando spent the better part of 2010–11 and 2011–12 on the sidelines, nursing an injury. In the first game upon his return, on 15 January 2012, he had to be stretchered off in the early minutes of the home fixture against Vitória de Guimarães, in an eventual 0–2 loss; after surgery, he remained inactive for nearly one year.

In the summer of 2012, after five seasons with the Briosa, Orlando parted ways with the club. In January of the following year he agreed on a return to Freamunde, who now competed now in the Segunda Liga.

Following Freamunde's relegation, Orlando signed for FC Felgueiras on a one-year deal.

References

External links

1979 births
Living people
People from Santo Tirso
Sportspeople from Porto District
Portuguese footballers
Association football defenders
Primeira Liga players
Liga Portugal 2 players
Segunda Divisão players
AD Fafe players
Moreirense F.C. players
S.C. Freamunde players
Associação Académica de Coimbra – O.A.F. players
F.C. Felgueiras 1932 players
Leixões S.C. players